Heimdal Upper Secondary School is one of the largest upper secondary schools in the county of Trøndelag, Norway. The school has approximately 700 students, 140 employees and the current headmaster is Ivar M. Husby.

History
During the 1970s the city of Trondheim was growing, and since Heimdal was growing relatively fast, it became natural to place an Upper Secondary School there. Opened 1 August 1977, there were 434 students that year, but over the years it quickly grew to approximately 700 students. In the middle of the 80s there was a total of around 900 students on the school (year 1985/86). Since the school could not support that many students, Tiller Upper Secondary School was established in the area.

New School building
The school is today housed in the original building from 1977 but it plans to move to a new building. The new building is around 33 000  m3 and house 1140 students. The new school was finished in August 2018 .

References

External links
 Official website 
 Historical Section of Official Website  

Secondary schools in Norway
Education in Trondheim
Buildings and structures in Trondheim
Trøndelag County Municipality
Educational institutions established in 1977